The 44th government of Turkey (20 September 1980 – 13 December 1983) was a technocratic government in the history of Turkey.

The elections
The 43rd government of Turkey came to an end because of the 1980 Turkish coup d'état. Parliament was dismissed and a technocratic government was formed. The prime minister was Bülent Ulusu, a retired admiral and the ex-commander of the Turkish navy, but the majority of the ministers were civilian technocrats.

The government
In the list below, the serving period of cabinet members who served only a part of the cabinet's lifespan are shown in the column "Notes".

Aftermath
The government ended with the elections held on 6 November 1983.

References

Cabinets of Turkey
1980 establishments in Turkey
1983 disestablishments in Turkey
Cabinets established in 1980
Cabinets disestablished in 1983
Members of the 44th government of Turkey
Advisory parliament of Turkey